Dogface butterfly or Dogface butterflies may refer to:
Zerene, a genus of butterflies commonly known as the Dogfaces
Zerene cesonia, a butterfly in this genus commonly known as the Dogface or Southern Dogface

Animal common name disambiguation pages